Alec Raymond Gibson (born December 9, 1963) is a former American football defensive end in the National Football League for the Washington Redskins.  Gibson played in three games for the Washington Redskins in 1987.  The Washington Redskins went 3-0 during the strike.  Defeating the St. Louis Cardinals,  New York Giants, and Dallas Cowboys.  Gibson caused Hall of Famer Tony Dorsett to fumble the football twice on Monday Night Football in Dallas the last replacement game played in 1987.  He played college football at Ventura Junior College where he was an All-American defensive tackle and at the University of Illinois as a defensive end.  In 1988, he played Arena football for the New York Knights.  Gibson played 11 of 12 games before injuring his right knee (ACL) which put an end to his career.

Alec Gibson was recently awarded a Super Bowl ring along with the other replacement players from the Washington Redskins' 1987 season.

1963 births
Living people
American football defensive ends
Illinois Fighting Illini football players
Washington Redskins players
New York Knights (arena football) players
Players of American football from Columbus, Ohio